The Portuguese conquest of Ceuta took place on 21 August 1415, involving the forces under the command of King John I of Portugal and the Marinid sultanate of Morocco. The city fell under Portuguese control after a carefully prepared attack, and the successful capture of the city marked the beginning of the Portuguese Empire.

Background
Ceuta is a north African coastal city strategically located on the Strait of Gibraltar. In 711, shortly after the Arab conquest of North Africa, the city was used as a departure point for in the Umayyad conquest of Hispania. However, the city was destroyed in 740 and only rebuilt in the 9th century, passing to the Caliphate of Córdoba in the 10th century. In the subsequent centuries it was ruled by the Almoravids, the Almohads as well as various Andalusian Taifas. Ceuta then experienced a period of political instability, under competing interests from the Marinid Empire and the Kingdom of Granada. A Nasrid fleet sent by Abu Said Faraj, Governor of Málaga, conquered Ceuta from the 'Azafids in May 1306; later, in 1309, the city was taken by the Marinids with the support of an Aragonese fleet.

The city featured rich trade with the Levant, Egypt, Libya, abundant tuna fishing stocks in its surrounding waters as well as coral, which constituted its main export industry, besides being also a notorious pirate haven, where Berber pirates sold their prey after raiding Iberian coasts and shipping. Ceuta's position opposite the straits of Gibraltar gave it control of one of the main outlets of the trans-African Sudanese gold trade; and it could enable Portugal to flank its most dangerous rival, Castile. It was defended by a composite system of walls, built and added to by various Moroccan dynasties throughout the centuries, most recently the Marinids, and with a high number of gates which could prove difficult to defend. It included a strong citadel built by the Marinids.

Relations between the Muslim Marinids of Morocco and the Nasrids Granada in southern Iberia were strained after Abu Said Uthman III had attempted to capture Gibraltar in 1411, while Yusuf of Granada in turn instigated a revolt in Morocco as a response.

After defeating a Castillian army that had invaded Portugal in 1385 at the Battle of Aljubarrota, the recently crowned King John I of Portugal signed a peace treaty with Castille, in 1411.

Even before signing peace with its only neighbour, King John I cast an eye at gaining Ceuta and began preparations as early as 1409. The chief promoter of the Ceuta expedition was João Afonso, royal overseer of finance. The children of King John, prince-heir Duarte, prince Peter and Prince Henry (later surname 'the Navigator') eagerly supported the project, as the prospect of taking of Ceuta offered them an opportunity to win wealth and glory.

Preparations for the conquest
Preparations for the conquest of Ceuta, such as the gathering of materials and money were begun years beforehand and carried out slowly, though the objective was kept a secret. No taxes were raised because such a course of action demanded a gathering of Cortes and it would risk leaking the objective of the projected expedition. Nor was currency debased. Loans were taken, foreign ships chartered, galleys repaired or were newly built until 30 had been assembled by the admiral of Portugal Carlos Pesanha, and expenses closely controlled.

Prince Henry, later surnamed 'the Navigator' was tasked with organizing the recruitment of men in the provinces of Beira and Trás-os-Montes and assemble them in the city of Porto. Henrys brother Peter was tasked with enlisting in the southern provinces of Extremadura, Alentejo and Algarve, with the gathering point at Lisbon. Prince-heir Duarte handled paperwork and judicial matters, though he fell into depression.

Faux embassy to Sicily
In order to scout the defenses of Ceuta beforehand, King John nominated the Prior of Crato Dom Álvaro Gonçalves Camelo as ambassador to the then regent and heir of the Kingdom of Sicily Blanche of Navarre. He was take two galleys commanded by general-of-the-sea Afonso Furtado de Mendoça and officially propose to Blanche the marriage of Prince Peter, but stop at Ceuta to take in supplies. They stopped at Ceuta for four days, and measured the depth of the harbour. Having successfully reached Sicily and received a negative reply, as King John had anticipated, they headed back to Portugal, again stopping at Ceuta.

After returning to Portugal, at the royal Palace of Sintra Dom Álvaro drew for King John and the princes in private a map of Ceuta and its surrounding geography with sand and thread.

Disclosure of the plan to the privy council
Only after he was in possession of these precise informations about Ceuta did King John then disclose his intentions to capture Ceuta to his wife Queen Philippa of Lancaster. By occasion of a hunting trip in Montemor-o-Novo later, the king then disclosed the project to the Constable of Portugal, the renown general Dom Nuno Álvares Pereira, who approved it in earnest.

Finally, the King disclosed the project to the highest members of the Court, at Torres Novas, to where he summoned the Queen, the princes, the Constable Dom Nuno Álvares Pereira, the royal chancellor João das Regras, the archbishop of Braga Dom Lourenço, the grandmaster of the Orders of Christ Dom Lopo Dias de Sousa, the grandmaster of the Portuguese order of Santiago Dom Fernando Afonso de Albuquerque, the grandmaster of Aviz Fernão Rodrigues de Sequeira, the prior of the Hospitallers Álvaro Gonçalves Camelo, the Marshal of Portugal Gonçalo Vasques Coutinho, lord Martim Afonso de Mello, and the royal ensign João Gomes da Silva. By order of the King, the Constable expressed his vote in favor of the expedition first, the council then voting unanimously in favour too.

Faux embassy to Holland

The secretive nature of the expeditions purpose caused numerous theories to rise among Portuguese society as to its true objective, some speculating the King meant to undertake a Crusade to the Levant, others to conquer the Kingdom of Sicily, still others (correctly) guessing Ceuta. By that point, rumours of the preparations being carried out in Portugal against a secret objective spread to many neighbouring realms and their rulers. The residents of Ibiza and Sicily made preparations to resist a possible Portuguese attack, in which they incurred considerable expense. Some French wrote to King Ferdinand of Aragon expressing their suspicion that the Portuguese were preparing to participate in the Hundred Years War alongside the English, in France.

King John II of Castile, King Ferdinand I of Aragon and the emir of Granada Yusuf III all sent embassies to the Portuguese Court enquiring on the purpose of King Johns preparations; the Castilian and Aragonese ambassadors were reassured that the purpose of the armada aimed neither Kingdom, but the ambassador of Granada was only given evasive answers.

In order to conceal the true objective of the expedition, John dispatched Fernão Fogaça as an ambassador to the Count of Holland William VI, with the official mission of publicly demanding from the Count a compensation over a number of abuses the Hollanders had supposedly carried out at sea against Portuguese mariners. The Count had in fact been informed by King John of the true purpose of this phony embassy beforehand, hence he entertained Fogaça with a public audience in which he offered such a rude reply that it might be understood as a declaration of war. As a result, rumour thus spread that King John was about to depart on an expedition to attack Holland.

Final gathering in Lisbon

In the Spring of 1415, plague broke out in Lisbon, forcing the Court to relocate to the nearby town of Sacavém. On July 10, 1415, Prince Henry called at Lisbon with a fleet of 7 galleys and 20 naus bearing a numerous corps of well-equipped men. Among them was Aires Gonçalves de Figueiredo, a 90 year old fidalgo at the command of a nau.

The Portuguese fleet probably numbered 59 galleys, 33 carracks or naus and 120 smaller vessels, bearing as many as 50,000 men, of which about 20,000 were combat personnel. It featured English, French and German mercenaries or soldiers of fortune. One German baron commanded 50 men of his household, while an Englishman by the name of Mondo commanded four ships.
The expedition included among its ranks some of the most important persons in Portugal at the time besides the king, such as prince-heir Duarte, prince Peter, prince Henry, the Count of Barcelos Dom Afonso de Cascais, the Constable of Portugal Dom Nuno Álvares Pereira and his nephew Dom Álvaro Pereira, the Grandmaster of the Order of Christ Dom Lopo Dias de Sousa, the prior of the Knights Hospitaller Dom Álvaro Gonçalves Camelo, the Admiral Carlos Pessanha, the Count of Viana Dom Diarte de Meneses, the General of the Sea Afonso Furtado de Mendonça, the first Duke of Braganza Dom Afonso, the Marshal of Portugal Gonçalo Vascques Countinho and the Royal Ensign João Gomes da Silva, among others. All of the main noble houses in Portugal participated in the expedition, with the notable exception of the Lima family.

Shortly before their departure, Queen Fillippa fell ill from the plague that was then affecting Lisbon. She moved from Lisbon to Sacavém and called her sons to her bedside so that she could give them her blessing. Philippa presented her three eldest sons with jewel-encrusted swords, which they would use in their impending knighthoods, and gave each a portion of the True Cross, "enjoining them to preserve their faith and to fulfil the duties of their rank".

Though he had been reluctant to marry her, the king had grown quite fond of his wife, and it is said that he was "so grieved by [her] mortal illness… that he could neither eat nor sleep". In her final hours, Philippa was said to be lucid and without pain. According to legend she was roused by a wind which blew strongly against the house and asked what wind it was, upon hearing it was the north wind, she claimed it quite beneficial for her son's and husband's voyage to Africa, which she had coordinated. At her death she prayed with several priests and, "without any toil or suffering, gave her soul into the hands of Him who created her, a smile appearing on her mouth as though she disdained the life of this world". The expedition was nearly called off, but King John decided to carry it through. A day of mourning was decreed, at the end of which Prince Henry commanded that all participants wear their best, the ships be decorated and trumpets be sounded with fanfare.

The grandmaster of the Order of Aviz was appointed to administer Portugal in the kings absence on July 23, and that day King John embarked on the royal galley. Two days later, the entire fleet weighted anchor and departed from Lisbon, while the citizens and local inhabitants watched from the surrounding hills and beaches.

From Sacavém, the Aragonese spy Ruy Dias de Vega wrote a few days later to the King of Aragon Ferdinand I that the objective of the expedition was rumoured to be either Ceuta or Gibraltar.

Itinerary of the Portuguese fleet
From the mouth of the Tagus River, the Portuguese fleet sailed south along the south-western coast of Portugal and rounded the Cape St. Vincent on July 26, and that night anchored at Lagos.

Lagos

The king disembarked at Lagos the day after arriving to hear Sunday mass, at the cathedral of Lagos by the royal chaplain the Franciscan João de Xira, who on the occasion read to the royal family and commanders the Crusade bull issued by the Pope in favour of all who would participate in the attack against Ceuta.

Faro
On 30 July the fleet weighted anchor to Faro, and as the wind blew weak, the fleet remained by that city till August 7, when they got on their way again. By late afternoon the Portuguese sighted Cape Espartel and turned out to sea, that night entered the Strait of Gibraltar and anchored by the Castilian town of Tarifa. Many members of the expedition were at that point convinced the ultimate goal of the fleet was to attack Sicily.

Tarifa
The settlement was then governed by the Portuguese Martim Fernandes Porto-Carreiro, who offered the king supplies and lifestock as refreshments. Since the fleet was well provided, King John refused the gift, but Porto-Carreiro was so offended by such rejection that he had the animals slaughtered and abandoned on the beach. As a compensation for this spirited act, the King and the royal princes gifted Porto-Carreiro rich jewels and 1000 dobras.

Algeciras
From Tarifa, the fleet next anchored at Algeciras, then belonging to the Emirate of Granada, subject to the Marinids of Morocco. King John ordered the attack on Ceuta from Tarifa on August 12, but when they moved out strong currents and contrary winds blew the Portuguese carracks east almost as far as Málaga, while the oarships proceeded to Ceuta and anchored in its harbour.

The attack on Ceuta

After the Portuguese galleys were in the harbour, the Marinid governor of Ceuta Salah ben Salah evacuated many of the women and children to the sorrouning lands and was reinforced by the tribal inhabitants of the region, voluntarily led by religious leaders. So many took up arms in the defense of Ceuta that the Portuguese would later claim no less than 100,000 had reinforced it. Ceuta received no aid whatsoever from the Sultan Abu Said Uthman III of Fez, either because the Marinid dynasty was too embroiled in internal disputes to be able to organize relief or because Salah ben Salah had been acting in an independent manner in recent years.

The first engagements between the Portuguese and the defenders of Ceuta then took place, with the Portuguese galleys being shot at from the walls, the vessel of the Admiral Carlos Pessanha being damaged the worst, as it as the closest to shore. Despite the separation of the fleet, Pessanha landed a detachment of men to skirmish with the Moroccans ashore.

Having gathered the armada in front of Ceuta on the 16th, King John determined to assault the city the following day, but heavy winds then scattered the Portuguese fleet once more, forcing the king to seek refuge in the bay of Algeciras with the oarships, while the carracks were blown further east.

Seeing the Portuguese fleet scatter and believing the attack would not longer take place, many of the undisciplined warriors and militias that had gathered in the city for its defense withdrew to their lands, while governor Salah ben Salah took the fatal decision of demobilizing the rest of the volunteers to prevent further conflict, leaving nothing but the usual garrison.

Interlude
From Algeciras, Prince Henry was instructed to bring back all the scattered carracks in tow of the galleys. Plagued broke out among the fleet and ravaged the crews. King John then held a Council of war with his command while anchored off Punta Carnero, Spain, but he rejected the opinion of those who suggested calling off the attack. On the night of August 20 the Portuguese fleet set out again, and anchored in the harbour of Ceuta, with the landing scheduled for the following day.

Salah Ben Salah ordered that as many available men as possible be posted on the walls and as many lights and candles be lit to give the impression of readiness and of a large and well-garrisoned city, but although brilliant the effect proved null on the Portuguese.

Assault of Ceuta

On the morning of 21 August 1415, John I of Portugal gave out the orders for the landing of the troops and a general assault on the city. As the king boarded a longboat to be taken ashore however, he was wounded in a leg. Prince Henry was signalled to lead the troops ashore instead.

The first to land was Ruy Gonsalves, renown for his daring, and encountered resistance upon landing on Playa San Amaro. Prince Henry was the first prince to land at the head of a squadron of men. He was followed by his brother, the prince-heir Edward, and at the head of about 300 men both succeeded in driving the Muslims defenders back to the Almedina gate, which was breached by the Portuguese before it could be securely shut.

The Moroccans managed to put up some resistance within the cramped urban environment just beyond the gate, encouraged by a very large Nubian or Sudanese who stood his ground hurling large stones. After he was slain by Vasco Martins de Albergaria however, the Muslims turned and fled, chased deeper into the city by prince Pedro, prince Henry and the Constable at the head of the Portuguese troops.

As the Portuguese poured into the city, Salah ben Salah descended from the high citadel to try and check the advance of the attackers in the narrow streets, so the residents could at least flee in time with their families and belongings. Disregarding the open gate through which Prince Henry had breached into the city, Vasco Fernandes de Ataíde attempted to open another gate at the head of a squadron of men, however they were repulsed and Ataíde mortally wounded.

Prince Henry left behind a detachment of men to secure the gate while they waited for rest of the army; it arrived shortly afterwards commanded by the King, prince Pedro and the Constable Nuno Álvares Pereira. King John would however take no further part in the fighting, and sat by the gate. During the urban fighting, rumour spread among the Portuguese troops that prince Henry had perished, as he could not be located. Upon being informed of the rumoured death of his son, king John is supposed to have replied that "such is the end which soldiers must expect".

Salah ben Salah held the citadel of Ceuta till sundown, but seeing no way to resist the Portuguese, he fled the city with a number of his men, taking their families and all they could carry. Only in the following morning of 21 August did the Portuguese realize the citadel was deserted. Ceuta was entirely in Portuguese hands and fighting ceased. Most of Ceutas residents fled the city, though a considerable number was killed in the action, and a few women, children and elderly unable to flee or take up arms could still be found in their houses.

Álvaro Vaz de Almada, 1st Count of Avranches was first hoisted the flag of Lisbon (or of Saint Vicent) over the Ceuta castle per orders of the king. This symbol still stands today as the flag of Ceuta, but in which the coat of arms of the Kingdom of Portugal were added to the center.

John's son Henry the Navigator distinguished himself in the battle, being wounded during the conquest.

Aftermath
On the 21st of August the Portuguese consecrated the main mosque into the cities cathedral. The Portuguese later found in its minaret two bells, which had previously been plundered by pirates from a Portuguese church in Lagos. Ceuta was constituted into a diocese, and the English Franciscan confessor of late Queen Philippa, friar Aymar d'Aurillac was appointed first bishop of Ceuta. That night was spent in careful watchfullness, and the morning of 22 of August was stormy with rain and hail.

The looting of the city was immense, though still less profitable than king John had expected. The Count of Barcelos Dom Afonso plundered more than 600 columns of marble and alabaster from the palace of Salah ben Salah and other buildings, along with an entire vaulted roof built with elaborate gilt work from a town square, for his residence in Portugal.

King John dispatched envoys to various European Courts notifying them of the victory. Among them, King John invited King Ferdinand of Aragon to join him in conquering north African lands, which Ferdinand appreciated, but died shortly after receiving the message.

Against the wishes of a considerable number of his men, he ultimately decided to keep the city, in order to pursue further enterprises in the area.

Appointing a governor proved unexpectedly difficult however, as many high-ranking nobles such as the Constable Nuno Álvares Pereira, the Marshal Gonçalo Vasques Coutinho and the head of the royal bodyguard Dom Martim Afonso de Melo all turned down the proposal of the king, but the Count of Viana Dom Pedro de Meneses willingly volunteered for the dangerous position. The father of Dom Pedro had sided with Castile against King John during the 1383-1835 Civil War, which may explain why Dom Pedro so eagerly sought the distinction.

The king ordered nearly 3000 men to stay behind as a garrison. It included 300 squires of the royal household, 300 squires of the household of prince-heir Edward, 250 squires of the household of prince Peter, 300 squires of the household of prince Henry, 600 crossbowmen on foot and horse, an unrecorded number of squires from the cities of Évora and Beja plus a number of nobles with their followers. Many common foot-soldiers deeply resented the prospect of living in an isolated frontier city, surrounded by hostile Muslim powers eager to obtain revenge on Christians, and fearing certain death or captivity, begged to be taken back, bribed officials to sneak them back aboard the ships or feigned illnesses. Some willingly settled in the city as militia, such as craftsmen.
Others eagerly embraced the life of frontiersmen. Likely many were nobles and their vassals, seeking wealth and glory in service overseas, such as Rui de Sousa, who stayed behind with 40 retainers. Such nobles could have become a serious factor of internal destabilization and conflict after peace had been signed with Castile in 1411.

Later history

As soon as the Portuguese fleet returned home with most of the army, the residents of Ceuta who had sought refuge in the surrounding hills and orchards attempted to recover the city numerous times, however they were easily fought back by the garrison in almost daily skirmishes. Dom Pedro had the houses, towers, orchards and groves around the city pulled down and ditches filled up so as to clear the line of sight around the city, and prevent ambushes.

After the conquest of Ceuta, the Casa de Ceuta was established in Portugal, being a royal institution with clerks, treasurers, warehouse officials and factors and numerous offices in Lisbon, Porto, Santarém and elsewhere, in charge of overseeing the supply of the city.

In 1419, the Marinid Sultan of Morocco Abu Said Uthman III laid siege to Ceuta with the help of the Nasrid Emir of Granada Muhammad VIII in an attempt to recover it, however the Portuguese successfully repulsed the attack under the able command of Dom Pedro de Meneses. Blamed for losing Ceuta, the  sultan was later assassinated when a coup took place in Fez in 1420, leaving only a child as his heir. Morocco descended into anarchic chaos, as rival pretenders vied for the throne and local governors carved out regional fiefs for themselves, selling their support to the highest bidder. The political crisis in Morocco released the pressure on Ceuta for the next few years.

In time, Ceuta became a formidable military base, and one of the main havens for Christian privateering in the western Mediterranean, and the main base from which Portuguese ships raided hostile Muslim shipping from Salé to Granada and Tunis, an activity which yielded the captain of Ceuta Dom Pedro de Meneses and King John I valuable profits. On the other hand, Christian navigation in the Strait of Gibraltar became safer. Portuguese raids caused the Moroccan shores to be abandoned by a considerable number of inhabitants, who fled inland, while foreign trade gradually faltered. Ceuta was sought by soldiers of fortune of various nationalities, such as Castilians, Aragonese, Flemings, Germans and even Poles looking to gain wealth and glory.

Having distinguished himself at Ceuta as a daring commander, Henry V of England, Pope Martin V, Emperor Sigismund and King John II of Castile later all offered Prince Henry the command of their armies upon hearing of his reputation, however Henry turned down these offers.

Under King John's son, Duarte, the stronghold of Ceuta rapidly became a drain on the Portuguese treasury. Trans-Sahara caravans journeyed instead to Tangier. It was soon realised that without the city of Tangier, possession of Ceuta was worthless.

After Edward succeeded king John on the throne of Portugal, in 1437 Henry and Ferdinand persuaded him to launch a new attack on the Marinid sultanate. The resulting attack on Tangier, led by Henry, was a debacle. In the resulting treaty, Henry handed his brother Ferdinand to the Moroccans as a hostage and promised to deliver Ceuta back to the Marinids in return for allowing the Portuguese army to depart unmolested.

Possession of Ceuta would indirectly lead to further Portuguese expansion. The main area of Portuguese expansion, at this time, was the coast of Morocco, where there was grain, cattle, sugar, and textiles, as well as fish, hides, wax, and honey.

Ceuta had to endure alone for 43 years, until the position of the city was consolidated with the taking of Ksar es-Seghir (1458), Arzila and Tangier (1471).

The city was recognized as a Portuguese possession by the Treaty of Alcáçovas (1479) and by the Treaty of Tordesilhas (1494).

See also 
 Tripas à moda do Porto
 Battle of Tangier (1437)
 Portuguese conquest of Ksar es-Seghir
 Anfa expedition (1468)
 Conquest of Asilah
 Portuguese Asilah
 Portuguese Tangier
 Illustrious Generation
 Aviz Dynasty
 Moroccan-Portuguese conflicts
 Portuguese Discoveries

References

Bibliography
 
 
 
 Malyn Newitt. A History of Portuguese Overseas Expansion 1400–1668 (2004) 
 Kenneth Warren Chase. Firearms: a global history to 1700 (2003) 
 
 Jeff Kinard. Artillery: an illustrated history of its impact (2007) 
 Peter O. Koch, To the ends of the earth: the age of the European explorers (2003) 

1415 in Portugal
1415 in the Portuguese Empire
Ceuta 1415
Battles involving the Marinid Sultanate
Conflicts in 1415
History of Ceuta
Kingdom of the Algarve